Bretz, West Virginia may refer to:
 Bretz, Preston County, West Virginia, an unincorporated community in Preston County, West Virginia
 Bretz, Tucker County, West Virginia, an unincorporated community in Tucker County, West Virginia